Jimi Bani is an Indigenous Australian actor, known for his portrayal of land rights activist Eddie Mabo in the 2012 tele-movie Mabo, several television series, and theatre performances.

Early life and education 
A Torres Strait Islander (Mabuiag Island) of the Wadagadum people, where his father was a tribal chief, he attended the Western Australian Academy of Performing Arts.

Career
Bani's first role was in the 2006 mini-series, RAN: Remote Area Nurse, that aired on SBS One. 

In 2012, he appeared on ABC1's series, The Straits and on the tele-movie Mabo, both of which were nominated for awards. Bani appeared in Redfern Now, a six-part series produced by Blackfella Films that went to air on ABC1 in late 2012. 

From late 2013 through 2014 Bani performed in The Shadow King for which he received a Helpmann Awards nomination. The play was produced by the Malthouse Theatre in association with the Confederation of Australian International Arts Festivals – Adelaide Festival, Brisbane Festival, Melbourne Festival, Perth International Arts Festival and Sydney Festival.

Bani was a member of Queensland Theatre's National Artistic Team to assist Artistic Director Sam Strong with its 2017 season. 

In 2017 he appeared in a Queensland Theatre production entitled My Name is Jimi which he co-created with Jason Klarwein who also directed the production. The performers included members of his family in a performance which " ... whisks you away to his island for an evening of music, dance, stand-up and storytelling. Four generations of one family take the stage, as Jimi’s grandmother, mother, son and brothers help him spin yarns of totems, traditions and childhood memories". The show was also performed at the Sydney Festival in 2018.

In early 2022 Bani played George in a State Theatre Company South Australia production of Edward Albee's Who's Afraid of Virginia Woolf?, to acclaim by critics. Later in 2022, Bani and Jason Klarwein staged an adaptation of Othello at Queensland Theatre, set in the Torres Straits. It was originally premiered at Cairns Indigenous Art Fair in 2021. Bani played Othello as a member of the Torres Straits Light Infantry Battalion during World War II. The production was staged in three languages; Kala Lagaw Ya, Yumplatok and English. Bani stated in an interview about the production that his great-grandfather was a member of the Torres Straits Light Infantry. Performing alongside Bani were his brothers, Richard Bani, Gabriel Bani and Conwell Bani, and they performed cultural songs and dances.

Awards 
 2009 nominated Helpmann Award for Best Male Actor in a Supporting Role in a Play, for Yibiyung
 2012 Winner Deadly Awards Male Actor of the Year Mabo
 2012 Winner Deadly Awards Film of the Year Mabo (part of the ensemble)
 2012 Winner Deadly Awards Television Show of the Year The Straits (part of the ensemble)
 2013 nominated Australian Academy of Cinema and Television Arts (AACTA) Awards Best Lead Actor in a Television Drama Mabo (2012)
 2013 nominated Silver Logie Most Outstanding Actor Mabo
 2013 nominated Equity Ensemble Awards Outstanding Performance by an Ensemble in a Telemovie or Mini-series Mabo
 2014 nominated Helpmann Award for Best Male Actor in a Supporting Role in a Play, for The Shadow King

Television

Theatre - actor 
Selected performances:

References

Year of birth missing (living people)
Living people
21st-century Australian male actors
Australian male stage actors
Australian male television actors
Indigenous Australian male actors